Stenoptilodes taprobanes is a moth of the family Pterophoridae. This species has a pantropical distribution, which extends into subtropical areas.

Its appearance is highly similar to that of Stenoptilodes brevipennis and for identification, the species needs to be characterized by the genitalia.

The larvae have been reported feeding on a various plants, including Hypoestes betsiliensis, Campylanthus salsoloides, Centipeda minima, Hydrolea species, Spergularia maritima, Vaccinium species, Sabatia species, Clinopodium vulgare, Antirrhinum majus and Samolus. Adults are on wing in February, April, July and September.

Gallery

References 

taprobanes
Moths described in 1875
Moths of Australia
Moths of Europe
Moths of Cape Verde
Moths of Africa
Moths of the Comoros
Moths of Asia
Moths of Japan
Moths of Madagascar
Moths of Mauritius
Moths of Réunion
Moths of São Tomé and Príncipe
Moths of Seychelles
Pantropical fauna
Taxa named by Alois Friedrich Rogenhofer